Poshteh-ye Gurband (also Romanized as Poshteh-ye Gūrband) is a village in Gurband Rural District, in the Central District of Minab County, Hormozgan Province, Iran. At the 2006 census, its population was 649, in 158 families.

References 

Populated places in Minab County